Kujović is a surname. Notable people with the surname include:

Dragan Kujović (born 1948), Montenegrin politician
Emir Kujović (born 1988), Swedish footballer
Vladan Kujović (born 1978), Serbian footballer

Serbian surnames
Montenegrin surnames